Paranisentomon is a genus of proturans in the family Eosentomidae.

Species
 Paranisentomon krybetes Zhang & Yin, 1984
 Paranisentomon linoculum (Zhang & Yin, 1981)
 Paranisentomon triglobulum (Yin & Zhang, 1982)
 Paranisentomon tuxeni (Imadaté & Yosii, 1959)

References

Protura